Carlos Miguel Benn (23 September 1924 – 26 March 2014) was an Argentine yacht racer who competed in the 1952 Summer Olympics. Benn was later a member of the Andean folk music group Los Incas.

References

External links
 

1924 births
2014 deaths
Argentine male sailors (sport)
Olympic sailors of Argentina
Sailors at the 1952 Summer Olympics – Finn